Dashli Borun (also Romanized as Dāshlī Borūn) is a village in Atrak Rural District, Dashli Borun District, Gonbad-e Qabus County, Golestan Province, Iran. At the 2006 census, its population was 970, in 203 families.

References 

Populated places in Gonbad-e Kavus County